Four Bacharach & David Songs is an extended play (EP) of four songs written by the songwriting team of Burt Bacharach and Hal David, performed by Scottish rock band Deacon Blue. It was released on 7-inch vinyl, 12-inch vinyl, CD, and cassette on 13 August 1990.

The first track, "I'll Never Fall in Love Again", was the main radio for the EP, and received extensive radio play in the United Kingdom and peaked at No. 2 on the UK Singles Chart, becoming Deacon Blue's best-charting single in the UK. The EP was later combined with tracks from Deacon Blue's compilation Riches and released as Riches & More in 1997.

Track listing
All songs were written by Burt Bacharach and Hal David.
 "I'll Never Fall in Love Again"
 "The Look of Love"
 "Are You There (With Another Girl)"
 "Message to Michael"

Charts

Weekly charts

Year-end charts

References

1990 debut EPs
Albums produced by Jon Kelly
Burt Bacharach tribute albums
CBS Records EPs
Covers EPs
Deacon Blue songs